Amaopusenibo Siminalayi "Sim" Fubara, was the former accountant general (from December 23, 2020 to May 2022) of Rivers State, Nigeria. He is the flag bearer of the People's Democratic Party for the 2023 governorship election in Rivers State. He was born in Opobo Town in Opobo/Nkoro Local Government Area of Rivers State.

Early life and education
He was born in Opobo Town in Opobo/Nkoro Local Government Area of Rivers State. He studied Accountancy at the Rivers State University of Science and Technology. He got his MBA and MSc in 2013 and 2016 respectively from the University of Port Harcourt.

Career
Sim started his career in 2003 as a principal accountant with the Rivers State Senior Secondary Schools Board. He rose to the position of director of finance and accounts at the State's government house in 2015 and rose to the position of permanent secretary in March 2020. He was appointed the accountant general of Rivers State on December 23, 2020, up till May 2022, when he won the People's Democratic Party governorship primaries for the 2023 general elections.
He is a Fellow of the Nigerian Institute of Management, Fellow of Association of National Accountants of Nigeria.

Controversy
In May 2022, Fubara and 58 other government officials were declared wanted by the Economic and Financial Crimes Commission for a NGN 435 billion fraud. 
He was also wanted for a NGN 117 billion fraud alongside four other Rivers State government officials. Additional charges by the EFCC included alleged criminal conspiracy, money laundering, misappropriation of public funds, and abuse of office.

Personal life
Fubara is a knight of St. Christopher (KSC) Order of Church of Nigeria Anglican Communion. He holds the traditional chieftaincy title of Amaopu-Senibo of Opobo Kingdom. He is married and has three children.

References

Living people
University of Port Harcourt alumni
Rivers State University alumni
Nigerian accountants
Nigerian politicians
Rivers State Peoples Democratic Party politicians
Rivers State gubernatorial candidates
Rivers State politicians
People from Opobo
People from Opobo–Nkoro
Year of birth missing (living people)